Tichon Serafimovich Hvesin (September 21, 1894 – February 10, 1938) was a Soviet military and statesman, as well as chairman of the Saratov Regional Executive Committee (1935-1936).

Biography
Hvesin was born in a working-class family. In 1911 he joined the RSDLP. During World War I he rose to the rank of non-commissioned officer. In 1918 he became a military commissar of the Saratov province.

During the Civil War, he commanded many military units: in September–November 1918 - the 4th Army of the Eastern Front, in March–May 1919 - the 8th Army of the Southern Front, in May–June 1919 he led the Expeditionary Group, which suppressed Cossack uprisings on the Don, then was an assistant commander of the Orenburg group of forces and the 1st Army, in 1920 - an assistant commander of the Special Group of Forces of the Turkestan Front, then was transferred to the Polish Front, where he became commander of the Mozyr Group.

In 1921-1923 he was an assistant commander of the Ural Military District, in 1922-1923 he was the head of the Main Directorate of Police, from 1924 he worked in civilian institutions, was chairman of the USSR State Planning Commission.

Since 1934 he is the chairman of the organizing committee of the All-Russian Central Executive Committee for the Saratov Territory, and in January 1935 - January 1936 - chairman of the executive committee of the Saratov Regional Council.

Then - until September 1937 he was the first deputy commissar of communal services of the RSFSR.

On September 23, 1937, he was arrested and charged with participation in a counter-revolutionary terrorist organization. The military collegium of the Supreme Court of the USSR on February 8, 1938, sentenced him to death. The verdict was executed on February 10, 1938. On October 5, 1955, T. S. Khvesin was posthumously rehabilitated.

Works
How industry is organized and operates during the war. M. - L., 1928.

Memory
A street in Saratov was named in honor of Hvesin in 1976.

References

External links
 Варианты биографии Т. С. Хвесина на hrono.ru
 Т. С. Хвесин в списке жертв политического террора в СССР

1894 births
1938 deaths
People from Orenburg
People from Orenburgsky Uyezd
Russian Jews
Russian Social Democratic Labour Party members
Old Bolsheviks
Russian military personnel of World War I
Soviet military personnel of the Russian Civil War
Soviet military personnel of the Polish–Soviet War
Great Purge victims from Russia
People executed by the Soviet Union
Soviet rehabilitations